Krawczuk is a surname. Notable people with the surname include:
 Łukasz Krawczuk (born 1989), Polish sprinter
 Aleksander Krawczuk (1922–2023), Polish historian and academic
 Elżbieta Anna Krawczuk-Trylińska (1960–2017), Polish athlete

Polish-language surnames